Stanley Wyatt-Smith (3 April 1887 – 17 November 1958) was Consul-General of Manila (1938–42) and Honolulu (1943–44). A collection of his photographs taken in Wuhan during the 1911 Xinhai Revolution, form part of the 'Historical Photographs of China' project and are held at the University of Bristol.

Early life
Wyatt-Smith was born in Minchinhampton on 3 April 1887 the son of Rev. WH Smith and Susannah (née Rice). He was educated at Bedford Modern School and King's College London.

Diplomatic service
In 1907 Wyatt-Smith entered the Consular Service in China.  He was a student interpreter in Peking (1907–09), and later witnessed the 1911 (Xinhai) Revolution; his photographs of the aftermath of that revolution form part of the 'Historical Photographs of China' project and are held at the University of Bristol. He was later student interpreter in Shanghai (1913–14) and Swatow (1914–17), before being made acting Consul at Tsinan (1917–18) and later at Wuchow (1918–20).

Wyatt-Smith was Vice-Consul at Hankow (1921), Shanghai (1922–23), Senior District Officer at Wei-hai-wei (1923–25), Consul at Chinkiang (1926–27) and Tengyeuh (1927–31).  The American journalist Edgar Snow stayed with Wyatt-Smith in Tengyeuh as relayed in Robert Farnsworth's book about Snow's time in Asia: 'Stanley Wyatt-Smith, the British consul, was a congenial and well-informed host'. Lady Diana Cooper described him as,'...delightful...His confidence and poise far exceeded any English Consuls I have seen'.

After Tengyeuh, Wyatt-Smith was Consul at Changsha (1931–32), Newchang (1933), Tsinan (1933), Foochow (1934–36) and Swatow (1937–38). In 1938 Smith was promoted to Consul-General of Manila (1938–42) until he was interned at Santo Tomas Internment Camp by the Japanese military authorities on the occupation of Manila and repatriated in 1942. In 1943 he was made Consul-General of Honolulu until his retirement in 1945.

Family life
Wyatt-Smith married firstly Clara Mabel Smyth (one son and one daughter, his son killed on active service in 1945).  He married secondly Beatrix, eldest daughter of Sir Francis Metford KCB OBE.  He died in Burleigh, Stroud, Gloucestershire, on 17 November 1958.

Further reading

Where China meets Burma; life and travel in the Burma-China border lands, by Beatrix Metford (Mrs Wyatt-Smith).  Published by London Blackie, 1937
Chung Mien chih chiao, by Beatrix Metford and Wu kuang fu.  Republished Beijing, 2014

External links
 Wyatt-Smith, Stanley Collection, Historical Photographs of China Project

References

1887 births
1958 deaths
People educated at Bedford Modern School
Alumni of King's College London
British expatriates in China
British expatriates in the Philippines